Harry Brookings Wallace (August 6, 1877 - August 11, 1955) was the acting chancellor of Washington University in St. Louis from 1944 to 1945.

Biography
Harry Brookings Wallace was born in St. Louis on August 6, 1877. He attended Smith Academy in St. Louis, and graduated from Yale University in 1899. While there, he was a varsity baseball player.

The nephew of Robert S. Brookings, he became a trustee of the Brookings Institution in 1927. He was president of Cupples & Marston from 1917 to 1942.

He was the acting chancellor of Washington University in St. Louis from July 1944 to September 1945.

He died at his home in St. Louis on August 11, 1955, and was buried at Bellefontaine Cemetery.

References

External links
 Washington University in St. Louis

1877 births
1955 deaths
Brookings Institution people
Burials at Bellefontaine Cemetery
Chancellors of Washington University in St. Louis
Yale Bulldogs baseball players
Washington University in St. Louis faculty